Pseudogymnoascus destructans (formerly known as Geomyces destructans) is a psychrophilic (cold-loving) fungus that causes white-nose syndrome (WNS), a fatal disease that has devastated bat populations in parts of the United States and Canada. Unlike species of Geomyces, P. destructans forms asymmetrically curved conidia. Pseudogymnoascus destructans grows very slowly on artificial media and cannot grow at temperatures above 20 °C. It can grow around 4 °C to 20 °C, which encompasses the temperatures found in winter bat hibernacula. Phylogenic evaluation has revealed this organism should be reclassified under the family Pseudeurotiaceae, changing its name to Pseudogymnoascus destructans.

History
In 2008, Blehert et al. described the fungus associated with white-nose syndrome as a member of the genus Geomyces. In 2009, Gargas et al. were the first to describe the fungus as a unique species; the specific name they chose, "", means "destroying". The fungus was definitively identified as the cause of the syndrome in bats, according to research published in 2011 by scientists at the United States Geological Survey. It was previously unknown whether this fungus was the primary cause of WNS or was an opportunistic pathogen associated with the disease, though strong evidence suggested that the fungus was the etiologic agent. In 2013, an analysis of the phylogenetic relationship indicated that this fungus was more closely related to the genus Pseudogymnoascus than to the genus Geomyces changing its Latin binomial to Pseudogymnoascus destructans.

Distribution
Pseudogymnoascus destructans is believed to originate from Europe. The current P. destructans European distribution includes Austria, Belgium, Czech Republic, Denmark, Estonia, France, Germany, Hungary, the Netherlands, Poland, Romania, Slovakia, Switzerland, Turkey, Ukraine and the United Kingdom.

The North American geographic distribution of P. destructans continues to increase each year since its initial introduction to New York State in 2006. Its current distribution includes 38 states in the U.S.A. and at least 7 Canadian provinces.

Bat species affected by P. destructans
In North America, P. destructans has been found to infect at least eleven species of bats, of which it has caused diagnostic symptoms of white-nose syndrome in the endangered Indiana bat (Myotis sodalis), the endangered gray bat (Myotis grisescens), the endangered little brown bat (Myotis lucifugus), the northern long-eared bat (Myotis septentrionalis), the big brown bat (Eptesicus fuscus), the tri-colored bat (Perimyotis subflavus), and the eastern small-footed bat (Myotis leibii). Pseudogymnoascus destructans has been found on four additional North American bat species: the endangered Virginia big-eared bat (Corynorhinus townsendii virginianus), the cave bat (Myotis velifer), the  Silver-haired bat (Lasionycteris noctivagans), and the  South-eastern bat (Myotis austroriparius). The European bat species that have been shown to harbour P. destructans include Bechstein's bat (Myotis bechsteinii), Lesser mouse-eared bat (Myotis blythii oxygnathus),  Brandt's bat (Myotis brandtii),  pond bat (Myotis dasycneme),  Daubenton's bat (Myotis daubentonii),  Greater mouse-eared bat (Myotis myotis),  whiskered bat (Myotis mystacinus),  Geoffroy's bat (Myotis emarginatus),  Northern bat (Eptesicus nilssonii),  Lesser horseshoe bat (Rhinolophus hipposideros), Barbastell (Barbastella barbastellus),  Brown long-eared bat (Plecotus auritus) and  Natterer's bat (Myotis nattereri), although large-scale European bat related fatalities are not reported.

Biology

 
P. destructans is a psychrophilic fungus, able to grow below  and with an upper limit near . This fungus produces brown and grey colonies, secretes a brownish pigment and reproduces asexually via characteristically curved conidia when cultured on Sabaouraud dextrose agar. The asymmetrically curved conidia are produced at the tips or sides singly or in short chains. Arthroconidia can be present and undergo rhexolytic separation. The in vitro growth rate of P. destructans is reported to be very slow; however, several studies have shown that not all P. destructans isolates grow at the same rate. P. destructans grows as an opportunistic pathogen on bats, causing white-nose syndrome, but it can also persist in the cave environment, as a saprotroph. P. destructans can grow and sporulate (reproduce asexually via conidiation) on keratinaceous, chitinaceous, cellulosic, and lipid/protein rich substrates including dead fish, mushroom fruit bodies and dead insects. P. destructans has been shown to utilize many nitrogen sources: nitrate, nitrite, ammonium, urea, and uric acid. Although P. destructans can penetrate senescing moss cells, cellulosic debris may not be a long term substrate for colonization. P. destructans can tolerate elevated levels of environmental inhibitory sulfur compounds (cysteine, sulfite, and sulfide), grow over a wide pH range (pH 5-11), tolerate elevated environmental levels of calcium; however, P. destructans was found to be intolerant to matric-induced water stress.

Enzymatic activity
 Under laboratory conditions, P. destructans has been shown to produce numerous enzymes including β-glucosidase, esterase/esterase lipase/lipase, leucine and valine arylamidase, N-acetyl-β-glucosaminidase, naphthol-AS-B1-phosphohydrolase, both acid and alkaline phosphatases, various proteinase, and urease, while testing negative for cystine arylamidase, α-chymotrypsin, alpha/beta-galactosidase, β-glucuronidase, α-fucosidase, α-mannosidase, and trypsin. Important dual virulence factors found in P. destructans and many other pathogenic fungi include urease, proteinase (aspartyll) and superoxide dismutase.

Control agents
In 2011, several compounds (antifungals, fungicides, and biocides) where shown to effectively inhibit the growth of P. destructans including benzalkonium chloride, chloroacetoxyquinoline, chloroxine, ciclopirox olamine, econazole, phenylmercuric acetate, pyrithione zinc and sulconazole. The same study showed that P. destructans was sensitive to Amphotericin B, itraconazole, ketoconazole, posaconazole and voriconazole, while the fungus had some resistance to anidulafungin, caspofungin, flucytosine and micafungin. A recent study (2014) identified several volatile organic compounds (benzaldehyde, benzothiazole, decanal, nonanal, N,N-dimethyloctylamine, and 2-ethyl-1-hexanol) that were previously identified from fungistatic soils, which demonstrated inhibition of both mycelial extension and growth from conidia.

A 2015 study showed that Rhodococcus rhodochrous could inhibit the growth of P. destructans.

A positive breakthrough may have come while utilizing competitive genetics to investigate the evolutionary history of P. destructans compared to six closely related nonpathogenic species. The study published in the journal Nature in 2018 discovered that due to a lost enzyme, P. destructans lacks an ability to repair DNA which has been damaged by ultraviolet (UV) light. Ongoing research is taking place to see if there is a practical method to have bats activate a UV system as they enter and leave a hibernaculum and treat their infection. Not a long term solution, it may be enough to avoid population collapse allowing the species to evolve its own defenses to the fungus as Eurasian bats have.

References

External links 

Fungi described in 2009
Fungi of Europe
Dothideomycetes enigmatic taxa
Parasitic fungi